This is a comprehensive list of tunnels in Albania.

Roadway tunnels

Railway tunnels

Underground tunnels

See also
 List of tunnels by location

References

Lists of tunnels
Tunnels
Tunnels